Mukim Kuala Balai is a mukim in Belait District, Brunei. The population was 31 in 2016.

Geography 
The mukim borders Mukim Seria to the north, Mukim Labi to the east and south, the Malaysian state of Sarawak to the west and Mukim Kuala Belait to the north-west.

The mukim is named after Kampong Kuala Balai, one of the villages it encompasses.

Demographics 
As of 2016 census, the population was 31 with  males and  females. The mukim had 4 households occupying 4 dwellings. The entire population lived in rural areas.

Villages
As of 2016, Kampong Tanjong Ranggas is the only populated village in Mukim Kuala Balai.

References 

Kuala Balai
Belait District